Dorogushikha is a rural locality (a village) in Razinskoye Rural Settlement, Kharovsky District, Vologda Oblast, Russia. The population was 39 as of 2002.

Geography 
Dorogushikha is located 44 km north of Kharovsk (the district's administrative centre) by road. Kryukovo is the nearest rural locality.

References 

Rural localities in Kharovsky District